Conscription in Iran all boys who reach the age of 18 must spend about two years of compulsory military service in the Iranian army or the Islamic Revolutionary Guard Corps. Often, the General staff of the armed forces of Iran chooses where people will serve, and a person cannot choose where to serve. The length of conscription is between 18 months to 2 years. 

Before the 1979 revolution, women were also forced to serve in the military. However, after the establishment of the Islamic Republic, some Ayatollahs considered women's military service to be disrespectful to women by the Pahlavi government and banned women's military service in Iran. Therefore, Iranian women and girls were completely exempted from military service, which caused Iranian men and boys to oppose.

In Iran, boys who refuse to go to military service are deprived of their citizenship rights, such as employment, health insurance, continuing their education at university, finding a job, going abroad, opening a bank account, etc. Iranian boys have so far opposed mandatory military service and demanded that military service in Iran become a job like in other countries, but the Islamic Republic is opposed to this demand. Some Iranian military commanders consider the elimination of conscription or improving the condition of soldiers as a security issue and one of Ali Khamenei's powers as the commander-in-chief of the armed forces, so they treat it with caution. In Iran, usually prosperous and wealthy people are exempted from conscription. Some other boys can be exempted from conscription due to their fathers serving in the Iran-Iraq war.

This period for military service is divided into two parts; The basic training period is about 2 months in some determined garrisons, and after that, they are sent to their main destination garrison.  The conscripts do not have any authority to select the branches for serving this compulsory period.  When the applicants submit their applications, the Armed Forces of the Islamic Republic of Iran decides to assign them to different organizations based on their needs and availability. These garrisons belong to different branches consisting of the Islamic Republic of Iran Regular Forces (Artesh): Ground Forces, Navy, Air Force (IRIAF), Khatemolanbia Air Defense Headquarters; Islamic Revolutionary Guard Corps (Sepah-e Pasdaran-e Enqelab-e Eslami, IRGC): Ground Resistance Forces, Navy, Aerospace Force, Quds Force (special operations). There is also, Non-military service (Civilian Service) ( read "Amriyeh") is a substitute for military service.

Non-Military Conscription (Civilian Service)
A non-military option would be a highly competitive alternative for educated and qualified applicants due to its benefits in comparison with the military, such as not wearing a military uniform, serving in official tasks, making a resume, and considering it as a potential opportunity to be hired after completing a conscription period as an employee. In fact, an Amriyeh is like an employee with almost all the benefits of a permanent full-time employee. The conscripts also must have some qualifications such as academic education, research experience, publications and papers in the relevant fields, top grades, innovative ideas, etc. There are some organizations that are allowed to hire an Amrie including but not limited to, the Ministry of Education, knowledge-based organizations, the Ministry of Cooperatives, Labor and Social Welfare, the Ministry of Defense and Armed Forces Logistics, The Ministry of Health and Medical Education, the Ministry of Justice, the Ministry of Science, Research and Technology, the Ministry of Petroleum, the Ministry of Cultural Heritage, Tourism and Handicrafts, etc.

History

Conscription was first introduced by Reza Shah in June 1925 and approved as law by the National Consultative Assembly. At that time every male person who had reached 21 years old must serve in the military for 2 years. However, as the country needed 100,000 men and the qualified population then was 1,000,000, they announced just one man between every 10 men must serve in the military.

Conscription time
Conscription time is shown in months in each year:

Female Conscription
Before the 1979 Iranian Revolution, both men and women were conscripted. Post-revolution, the law changed and women were no longer subject to conscription.

Gallery

References 

Iran
Military of Iran